German submarine U-691 was a Type VIIC/41 U-boat of Nazi Germany's Kriegsmarine during World War II. Her construction by Howaldtswerke of Hamburg was ordered on 2 April 1942, suspended on 30 September 1943, and cancelled on 22 July 1944. The new Elektro Boat XXI design had made the Type VIIs obsolete.

In fiction
Neal Stephenson's novel Cryptonomicon includes a fictitious U-691, a Type IXD/42, launched at Wilhelmshaven on 19 September 1940 (four years before IXD/42s were actually developed) and fitted with an experimental schnorkel.

References

Bibliography

External links

German Type VIIC/41 submarines
World War II submarines of Germany